Pangarappilly  is a village in Chelakkara Thrissur district in the state of Kerala, India.

Demographics
 India census, Pangarappilly had a population of 5318 with 2504 males and 2814 females.

References

Villages in Thrissur district